Jacek Wierzchowiecki (30 March 1944 – 1 September 2015) was a Polish equestrian. He competed at the 1972 Summer Olympics and the 1980 Summer Olympics.

References

1944 births
2015 deaths
Polish male equestrians
Olympic equestrians of Poland
Equestrians at the 1972 Summer Olympics
Equestrians at the 1980 Summer Olympics
People from Przysucha County